This is a partial list of entertainment venues in London, England.

Theatres
The majority of London's commercial "theatre land" is situated around Shaftesbury Avenue, the Strand and nearby streets in the West End. The theatres are receiving houses, and often feature transfers of major productions from the Royal National Theatre and Royal Shakespeare Company. (See the article "West End theatre", and see also Theatre companies in London).

The following list also includes the major non-commercial theatres in London, many of which are to be found beyond the West End.

West End theatres
Also see List of West End theatres for further specifications.

Adelphi Theatre
Aldwych Theatre
Ambassadors Theatre
Apollo Theatre
Apollo Victoria Theatre
Arts Theatre
Cambridge Theatre
Criterion Theatre
Dominion Theatre
Duchess Theatre
Duke of York's Theatre
Fortune Theatre
Garrick Theatre
Gielgud Theatre
Gillian Lynne Theatre (formerly New London Theatre)
Harold Pinter Theatre
Haymarket Theatre
Her Majesty's Theatre
London Palladium
Lyceum Theatre
Lyric Theatre
Noël Coward Theatre
Novello Theatre
Palace Theatre
Phoenix Theatre
Piccadilly Theatre
Playhouse Theatre
Prince Edward Theatre
Prince of Wales Theatre
Savoy Theatre
Shaftesbury Theatre
Sondheim Theatre (formerly The Queen's Theatre)
St Martin's Theatre
Theatre Royal, Drury Lane
Trafalgar Studios
Vaudeville Theatre
Victoria Palace Theatre
Wyndham's Theatre

Outside the West End
Many major important theatres and National venues are sited beyond the traditional West End theatre land. They include the Royal National Theatre on the South Bank; the nearby Young Vic, Old Vic and Globe Theatres; Sadler's Wells in Rosebery Avenue and Barbican Arts Centre to the east; and the Royal Court Theatre in Chelsea.

Above the Stag Theatre - 100 (Vauxhall)
Albany Theatre - 300 (Deptford)
Almeida Theatre - 325 (Islington)
Arcola Theatre - 240 (Shacklewell)
Artsdepot, Pentland - 395, Studio - 160 (North Finchley)
The Ashcroft Theatre at Fairfield Halls - 755 (Croydon)
The Barbican Theatre, at the Barbican Arts Centre - 1155 (City of London)
Barons Court Theatre - 60 (Barons Court)
Battersea Arts Centre, Grand Hall - 500; Lower Hall - 140 (Battersea)
Beck Theatre - 600 (Hayes, Hillingdon)
Bloomsbury Theatre - 560 (Bloomsbury)
Blue Elephant Theatre - 50 (Camberwell)
The Bob Hope Theatre - 30 (Eltham)
Bonnie Bird Theatre at Trinity Laban - 300 (Deptford)
Brick Lane Music Hall - 200 (Silvertown)
The Broadway - 340 (Barking)
The Broadway Theatre, Main Auditorium - 800; Studio - 80 (Catford)
Bridewell Theatre - 135 (Blackfriars)
Bridge Theatre - 900 (South Bank)
Brockley Jack Studio Theatre - 65 (Brockley)
Brookside Theatre - 140 (Romford)
Bush Theatre - 145 (Shepherd's Bush)
Camden People's Theatre - 60 (Bloomsbury)
Canal Cafe Theatre - 60 (Maida Vale)
Charing Cross Theatre - 265 (Charing Cross)
Charles Cryer Theatre - 125 (Carshalton)
Chelsea Theatre - 110 (Chelsea)
Churchill Theatre - 785 (Bromley)
Cockpit Theatre - 240/180 (Marylebone)
Compass Theatre - 160 (Ickenham)
Courtyard Theatre, Main House Theatre - 150; Studio - 80 (Shoreditch) 
Drayton Arms Theatre - 50 (Kensington)
Donmar Warehouse - 250 (Covent Garden)
The Drill Hall at RADA Studios, Studio - 200; Club - 50 (Fitzrovia)
Erith Playhouse - 195 (Erith)
Etcetera Theatre - 40 (Camden Town)
Finborough Theatre - 50 (Earls Court)
Found 111 - 140 (Soho)
Gate Theatre - 60 (Notting Hill)
Greenwich Theatre - 420 (Greenwich)
Hackney Empire - 1275 (Hackney)
Hammersmith Apollo - 3630 (Hammersmith)
Hampstead Theatre, Main Auditorium - 325max; Michael Frayn Studio - 80 (Hampstead)
Hen and Chickens Theatre - 55 (Highbury)
The Hope Theatre - 50 (Islington)
Hoxton Hall - 320 (Hoxton)
Jacksons Lane - 165 (Highgate)
Jermyn Street Theatre - 70 (St James's)
Kenneth More Theatre, Main Auditorium - 365; Studio - 50 (Ilford)
King's Cross Theatre, Traverse - 995; End on - 495 (King's Cross)
King's Head Theatre - 120 (Islington)
Landor Theatre - 60 (Clapham)
Leicester Square Theatre - 400 (Leicester Square)
The Lion & Unicorn Theatre - 60 (Kentish Town)
Little Angel Theatre - 100 (Islington)
Lyric Theatre, Hammersmith, Main Auditorium - 550; Studio - 110 (Hammersmith)
Menier Chocolate Factory - 180 (Southwark)
Millfield Theatre - 360 (Edmonton)
Network Theatre - 70/90 (Lambeth)
New Diorama Theatre - 80 (Regent's Park Village)
New Wimbledon Theatre, Main Auditorium - 1670; Studio - 80 (Wimbledon)
Old Red Lion Theatre - 60 (Islington)
Old Vic Theatre - 1070 (Lambeth)
Open Air Theatre - 1200+ (Regent's Park)
Open Air Theatre, Barra Hall Park - 180 (Hayes, Hillingdon)
Orange Tree Theatre - 170 (Richmond)
OSO Arts Centre - 74 (Barnes)
The Other Palace (formerly St. James Theatre), Main Auditorium - 312; Studio - 120 (Victoria)
Ovalhouse, Downstairs - 200; Upstairs - 70 (Kennington)
The Park Theatre, Main Auditorium - 200; Studio - 90 (Finsbury Park)
Peacock Theatre - 1000 (Holborn)
Pentameters Theatre - 60 (Hampstead)
The Pit at the Barbican Centre - 200 (City of London)
Platform Theatre - 150 (King's Cross)
The Pleasance Theatre, Main Auditorium - 260; Studio - 55 (Caledonian Road)
Polka Theatre, Main Auditorium - 300; Studio - 70 (Wimbledon)
Print Room, Main Auditorium - 180; Studio - 100 (Notting Hill)
Puppet Theatre Barge - 50 (Maida Vale)
Queen's Theatre, Hornchurch - 500 (Hornchurch)
Queen Elizabeth Hall - 900 (South Bank)
Questors Theatre, Judi Dench Playhouse - 355; Studio - 100 (Ealing)
Red Hedgehog Theatre, Salon Theatre - 40 (Highgate)
Richmond Theatre - 840 (Richmond)
Rose Theatre, Kingston - 900 (Kingston)
Rosemary Branch Theatre - 55 (Shoreditch)
Royal Court Theatre, Upstairs - 380; Downstairs - 85 (Sloane Square)
Royal National Theatre, Olivier - 1100; Lyttelton - 890; Dorfman - 400; Temporary - 225 (South Bank)
The Roundhouse - 1700 (Chalk Farm) 
Rudolf Steiner Theatre - 220 (Westminster)
Sadler's Wells Theatre, Main Auditorium - 1560; Lilian Baylis Studio - 200 (Islington)
Shakespeare's Globe, Globe - 1400; Sam Wanamaker Playhouse - 340 (South Bank)
Shaw Theatre - 445 (Somers Town)
Shoreditch Town Hall - 500 (Shoreditch)
Soho Theatre - 160 (Soho)
South London Theatre, Bell Theatre - 95; Prompt Corner - 60 (South Norwood)
Southwark Playhouse, Main Auditorium - 240; Studio - 120 (Newington)
The Space - 145 (Millwall)
Stratford Circus, Circus 1 - 300; Circus 2 - 95 (Stratford)
Tabard Theatre - 95 (Chiswick) 
The Place - 290 (Bloomsbury)
The Scoop - 800 (Southwark)
The Spread Eagle Theatre - 50 (Croydon)
The Vaults ~ 1000 (Lambeth)
Theatre503 - 65 (Battersea)
Theatre N16 at The Bedford - 75 (Balham)
Theatre Delicatessen, Black Box - 50; Cabaret Bar - 100 (Farringdon)
Theatre Royal Stratford East - 460 (Stratford)
Theatro Technis - 120 (Camden Town)
Tricycle Theatre - 235 (Kilburn) 
Troubadour Wembley Park Theatre - 1,000/ 2,000 (Wembley)
Turbine Theatre - 94 (Battersea)
Unicorn Theatre, Main Auditorium - 290; Studio - 100 (Southwark)
Union Chapel - 800 (Islington)
Union Theatre - 40 (Southwark)
Upstairs at The Gatehouse - 120 (Highgate)
Watermans Arts Centre - 240 (Brentford)
White Bear Theatre - 50 (Kennington)
Wilton's Music Hall - 300 (Shadwell)
Yard Theatre - 110 (Hackney)
Young Vic, Main Auditorium - 420; Maria Studio - 150; Clara Studio - 70 (Lambeth)

Former theatres

The List of English Renaissance theatres covers the period from the establishment of the first Tudor theatres, through to their suppression by parliament at the beginning of the English Civil War.

The List of Former theatres in London covers the period from the reopening of the playhouses after the English Restoration through to the 21st century.  It includes music halls.

Opera, ballet and dance
The two main opera houses are:
Royal Opera House, Covent Garden (the home of The Royal Opera and The Royal Ballet)
London Coliseum, Charing Cross (the home of English National Opera and English National Ballet)
Both of the above also stage ballet. Holland Park Opera stages opera at an outdoor venue in the summer. Several of the theatres listed have staged opera in the past, including the following:
Sadler's Wells - London's main dance theatre
Barbican Theatre - regularly hosts leading touring dance companies
Savoy Theatre, the former home of the D'Oyly Carte Opera Company (Gilbert and Sullivan - inactive)
Experimental, contemporary and fringe opera is occasionally programmed at Riverside Studios, which also hosts the annual Tete-a-Tete The Opera Festival. The Arcola Theatre also hosts a contemporary fringe opera festival called 'Grimeborn'.

Live music

93 Feet East (Shoreditch): Range
100 Club (Soho): Indie Rock/Pop
229 Club (Marylebone): Range
606 Club (Chelsea): Jazz
Alexandra Palace (Alexandra Park): Indie Rock/Pop
Barbican Hall, Barbican Centre (City of London): Classical/Jazz/World
Barfly (Camden Town): Indie Rock/Pop/Alternative
The Bedford (Balham): Range
Betty's Coffee (Dalston): Range
The Black Heart, Camden
Blackheath Halls (Blackheath): Classical
Blues Jam (Camden Town/Shoreditch): Jazz
Brixton Academy (Brixton): Indie Rock/Pop
The Borderline (Soho): Indie Rock/Pop
Bush Hall (Shepherd's Bush): Rock/Pop
Cadogan Hall (Belgravia): Classical
Camden Underworld (Camden Town): Rock/Metal
Cargo (Shoreditch): Dance
Conway Hall (Holborn): Classical
Cecil Sharp House (Primrose Hill): Folk
Dublin Castle (Camden Town): Rock/Pop
Electric Ballroom (Camden Town): Indie Rock/Pop
ExCeL Exhibition Centre (Royal Docks): Events
Fairfield Halls (Croydon): Pop/Classical
The Garage (Islington): Indie Rock/Pop
The Grand (Battersea): Dance
The Grey Horse (Kingston upon Thames): Rock/Blues
The Half Moon (Putney): Rock/Pop
Hammersmith Apollo (Hammersmith): Pop
Hanover Grand Theatre (Covent Garden): Disco
The Hobgoblin (Camden Town): Pop
Indig02 (North Greenwich): Pop
Jazz Cafe (Camden Town): Jazz
Kings Place (King's Cross): Classical/Jazz/Country
KOKO (Camden Town): Indie Rock/Pop
London Coliseum (Charing Cross): Opera
Leicester Square Theatre / The Venue (Leicester Square): Indie Rock/Pop
The Lexington (Pentonville): Indie Rock/Pop
London Forum (Kentish Town): Indie Rock/Pop
Milton Court (City of London): Classical/Jazz
O2 Academy Islington (Islington): Indie Rock/Pop
The O2 arena (North Greenwich): Pop
The Ocean Music Venue (Hackney Central): Indie Rock/Pop
Olympia, London (Kensington): Events
Passing Clouds (Dalston): Range
PizzaExpress Jazz Club (Soho): Jazz
The PowerHaus Camden (formerly Dingwalls): Indie Rock/Pop
Proud Camden (Camden Town): Range
The Purple Turtle (Camden Town):  Range
Purcell Room (Southbank Centre): Chamber
Queen Elizabeth Hall (Southbank Centre): Orchestral/Chamber
Ronnie Scott's Jazz Club (Soho): Jazz
The Roundhouse (Chalk Farm): Indie Rock/Pop
Royal Academy of Music (Marylebone): Classical/Jazz
Royal Albert Hall (South Kensington): Classical/Pop/Miscellaneous
Royal College of Music (South Kensington): Classical
Royal Festival Hall (Southbank Centre): Classical/Jazz
Royal Opera House (Covent Garden): Opera
Scala (King's Cross): Indie Rock/Pop
The Shacklewell Arms (Dalston): Indie Rock/Pop
Shepherd's Bush Empire (Shepherd's Bush): Pop
St John's, Smith Square (Westminster): Classical
St Luke Old Street (Old Street): Range
T. Chances (Tottenham War Services Institute): Punk
The Troubadour, Earl's Court
Troxy, (Commercial Road Stepney): Range
TwickFolk, at The Cabbage Patch, Twickenham (acoustic, folk and Americana)
The UCL Bloomsbury (Bloomsbury): Range
The Unicorn, Camden
Union Chapel (Highbury): Range
Vortex Jazz Club (Dalston): Jazz
Wembley Arena (Wembley): Rock/Pop
Wembley Stadium (Wembley): Rock/Pop
The Windmill (Brixton): Range
Wigmore Hall (Marylebone): Chamber
WM Jazz Club (North Greenwich): Jazz
XOYO (Old Street): Dance

Cinema
There are cinemas throughout Greater London, particularly multi-screen venues, however the majority of first run and independent films are shown in cinemas around Leicester Square.
Odeon Leicester Square
Odeon West End
Empire, Leicester Square
Prince Charles Cinema
Vue West End
National Film Theatre
London IMAX
Apollo cinemas

Clubs
There are clubs throughout Greater London, with many performing on a temporary basis. The more permanent ones are listed, but there is also a group of clubs in the Shoreditch and Hoxton areas.
Chuckle Club, a comedy club that began in 1986 and has changed venues over time
Electric Ballroom, a performance venue located in Camden Town constructed in the 1930s
Hippodrome, built in 1900, this building was used for most of its lifetime as a venue for revues and musical comedy; it now functions as a private (for-hire) event venue
HeyJo Club, Mayfair based Private Members Club owned by Dave West

Conference venues

Olympia London's Conference Centre
Altitude 360
Hilton London Metropole
Queen Elizabeth II Conference Centre
Cavendish Conference Centre
Mayfair Conference Centre
ICO Conference Centre
America Square Conference Centre
Museum of the Order of St John
Cavendish Venues
London Art House
W12 Conferences

Former venues
The 2i's Coffee Bar (1956–1970)
Camden Palace (1982–2004) – nicknamed Cammy Pally – reverted to KOKO in 2004
Infinity Club (2003–2005) – best known for its association with Carl Barât and The Libertines
London Astoria (indie rock and pop, closed and demolished 2009)
Mean Fiddler (indie rock and pop)
Turnmills
Windsor Castle, Maida Vale

References

Venues
Entertainment in London
Performing arts in London
London-related lists
London